Ammodytoides is a genus of sand lances native to the Indian and Pacific oceans.

Species
There are currently 10 recognized species in this genus:
 Ammodytoides gilli (T. H. Bean, 1895) (Gill's sand lance)
 Ammodytoides idai J. E. Randall & Earle, 2008
 Ammodytoides kanazawai Shibukawa & H. Ida, 2013
 Ammodytoides kimurai H. Ida & J. E. Randall, 1993
 Ammodytoides leptus Collette & J. E. Randall, 2000 (Pitcairn Sandlance)
 Ammodytoides praematura J. E. Randall & Earle, 2008
 Ammodytoides pylei J. E. Randall, H. Ida & Earle, 1994 (Pyle's sand lance)
 Ammodytoides renniei (J. L. B. Smith, 1957) (Scaly sandlance)
 Ammodytoides vagus (McCulloch & Waite, 1916)
 Ammodytoides xanthops J. E. Randall & Heemstra, 2008 (Yellow face sandlance)

References

Ammodytidae
Taxa named by Georg Duncker
Taxa named by Erna Mohr
Marine fish genera